Samuel Lathrop (May 1, 1772 – July 11, 1846) was a U.S. Representative from Massachusetts.

Biography
Samuel Lathrop was born on May 1, 1772 on the western side of Springfield (which would later be incorporated as a separate town in 1774) in the Province of Massachusetts Bay. He was the son of Reverend Joseph Lathrop, longtime pastor of the First Church of West Springfield. He pursued classical studies and graduated from Yale College in 1792.

He studied law., was admitted to the bar, and commenced practice in West Springfield. Lathrop served as West Springfield's clerk and treasurer from 1796 to 1798, and was town meeting moderator eight years. From 1817 to 1821 he served as Hampden County Attorney.

Lathrop was elected as a Federalist to the Sixteenth and Seventeenth Congresses, reelected as an Adams-Clay Federalist to the Eighteenth Congress, and reelected as an Adams candidate to the Nineteenth Congress (March 4, 1819 – March 3, 1827). He served as chairman of the Committee on Revisal and Unfinished Business (Seventeenth and Eighteenth Congresses). In 1824 Lathrop ran unsuccessfully for Governor of Massachusetts, losing to Levi Lincoln, Jr. Lathrop was the last Federalist nominee for Massachusetts governor.

After leaving Congress Lathrop resumed the practice of law and became a gentleman farmer. He served as member of the Massachusetts State Senate in 1829 and 1830 and served as President pro tempore. In 1831 and 1832 he ran unsuccessfully for governor as an Anti-Mason, losing both times to Lincoln. From 1829 to 1840 he was a trustee of Amherst College.

Death and burial
Lathrop died in West Springfield on July 11, 1846. He was interred in the Park Street Cemetery.

Family
In 1797 Lathrop married Mary McCracken, and they were the parents of four sons and six daughters.

References

1772 births
1846 deaths
People from West Springfield, Massachusetts
Yale College alumni
Massachusetts lawyers
Massachusetts Democratic-Republicans
Massachusetts state senators
Presidents of the Massachusetts Senate
Federalist Party members of the United States House of Representatives from Massachusetts
Burials in Massachusetts
19th-century American lawyers